The Annecy shootings, also the French Alps shootings or the Chevaline killings, were the deaths on 5 September 2012 of three members of a British family and a French citizen on the  near Chevaline, Haute-Savoie, France, near the southern end of Lake Annecy.

Four people were killed: an Iraqi-born British tourist named Saad al-Hilli, 50; his wife Iqbal, 47; her mother Suhaila al-Allaf, 74, who held a Swedish passport; and French cyclist Sylvain Mollier, 45. The al-Hillis' two daughters both survived the attack. The elder daughter, aged 7, was shot in the shoulder and also suffered a head wound; she returned to the United Kingdom on 14 September 2012.

Police investigated al-Hilli's past in Iraq as an engineer on sensitive topics, as well as his work at the time of his death, as a potential motive for the attack.

The attack has been compared to the 1952 killing of biochemist Jack Drummond in the Dominici affair.

In September 2017, after five years of investigation, French police said they had "no working theory" to explain the murders and no suspects. Veronique Dizot, the lead prosecutor, suggested that the family "may have been targeted randomly".

Description of the attack
The attack took place in a lay-by on the mountain-side road at about 15:45 CEST on 5 September 2012. Twenty-five shots were fired in total. Initial reports stated only one semi-automatic pistol was fired, though it was later reported that full ballistics analysis was likely to disprove this.
Eventually, ballistic analyses of the cartridge cases and butt plate fragments showed that the weapon used by the killer was a Luger P06 semi-automatic pistol (model 1906) firing the 7.65×21mm Parabellum ammunition with an eight round magazine. It is not a very powerful weapon, but it is reliable and extremely accurate up to fifty yards. This pistol was tested by various countries and widely exported to the USA in a commercial version, but was mainly adopted by the Swiss army until the middle of the 20th century after being slightly modified for the last time in 1929 (P06/29). It is now a collector's item.

The bodies were discovered by Brett Martin, a British ex-RAF pilot, who is a resident in France, while he was out riding his bicycle. He heard nothing of the shots. This might be because he was crossing the last river bridge just a few hundred metres from the murder location; the noise of the water easily masking the sound of gunfire. Al-Hilli's eldest daughter, seven-year-old Zainab, was the first victim he saw when he arrived on the scene. She was stumbling into the road and collapsed in front of the British family's BMW car.

Prior to the incident, the BMW was reversed sharply into the side of the lay-by, leaving marks which were still visible when the site was reopened to the public.
When Martin found the car, the engine was still running and the car was in reverse gear, the rear wheels spinning in the loose sand. The doors were locked. The deceased in the car were each shot twice in the head.

The French cyclist killed near the car was Sylvain Mollier. It has been reported that he was shot seven times.

Police investigation

On 10 September, the Royal Logistic Corps bomb disposal unit were called to the home of al-Hilli in Surrey after concerns were raised about items discovered during the police search, although the items under investigation were later described as "non-hazardous". The search did yield a Taser, an item that is illegal to possess in the UK.

In September 2012, in order to speed up the investigation, France and Britain agreed to create a joint Franco-British investigation team under Eurojust, which is rarely used in the UK.

A 54-year-old man was arrested on 24 June 2013 in Surrey in connection with the murders. Although unconfirmed by the police, some reports named the suspect as Zaid al-Hilli, the brother of Saad al-Hilli.

On 21 October 2013, BBC Panorama reported that a grey BMW X5 right hand drive 4×4 car was at the crime scene at the time of the murders, the driver of which may be a possible accomplice to the crime along with a motorcycle rider also spotted nearby. The motorcycle rider has been reported as having a goatee beard and an unusual helmet by French investigators.

Panorama also found that Zaid al-Hilli had tried to create a false will for his father and to withdraw £2m from his father's bank account at  Geneva in Switzerland. Zaid al-Hilli claimed he was not guilty of the shootings and offered to take a lie detector test. In January 2014, it was announced that there was insufficient evidence to bring a charge against Zaid al-Hilli and his bail was lifted.

Al-Hilli leads
Police investigating the shootings are following several leads relating to the activities of Saad al-Hilli. They have stated that he could have been targeted over a contract he was working on for EADS.
Connections to al-Hilli's previous work at the Rutherford Appleton Laboratory are also being investigated. There are considerations as to whether there was a family financial feud that may have led to a contract killing.

In October 2012, Swiss prosecutors stated al-Hilli had visited a bank in Geneva shortly before he was murdered. A leaked report revealed that Saad al-Hilli may have had access to bank accounts belonging to Saddam Hussein.

Mollier lead
It had been suggested that the target of the murders may have been Sylvain Mollier, instead of the al-Hilli family. A police source stated that Mollier, a local father of three who worked as a welder in a workshop at a subsidiary of Areva, "doesn't appear to have been exposed to nuclear secrets".

"Lone psychopath" theory
In October 2012, confidential police files on the case were leaked to a French newspaper, showing investigators believed the killings were carried out by "a lone and psychologically disturbed killer". One of the reasons given was that the killer used a pre-World War II Luger P06 semi-automatic pistol, a weapon unlikely to be used by a professional assassin.

Arrest of local ex-policeman
On 18 February 2014, a 48-year-old man was arrested following the issue of an artist's impression of a man in a motorcycle helmet. Police removed several guns from his home. It is not clear whether the investigators thought he could be involved in the killings. It was later shown that the policeman's DNA did not match the two samples found in the vehicle of the victims.

Missing motorcyclist
In 2015, the motorcyclist spotted nearby the incident, and sought by the police, was traced and ruled out of the inquiry as an innocent passer-by.

French Foreign Legionnaire
Since his suicide in June 2014, Patrice Menegaldo, an ex-French Foreign Legion soldier from Ugine, has been positioned very high on the list of suspects. According to Éric Maillaud, the state prosecutor: "The hypothesis at the top of the chain for the investigators is a local killing. We have a real suspect. I am referring to the Legionnaire from Ugine." 
Menegaldo had for seven years had an affair with Mollier's sister and knew Mollier's partner, Claire Schutz. Police assume that Menegaldo committed suicide because he thought of himself as being a suspect, even though police admitted not to have had him as a primary suspect when they spoke to him in April 2014.

Nordahl Lelandais hypothesis
Police are looking into whether a suspected serial killer could be behind the unsolved Alps murders. Nordahl Lelandais, a 34-year-old ex-soldier, is the main suspect in two other cases in the area.

One relates to the disappearance and death of an eight-year-old girl, Maëlys de Araujo, in August 2017 at a wedding where the suspect was a guest; the other to the killing of a hitchhiking soldier in April of the same year.

Lelandais has been in custody since September 2017, as part of the investigation of the disappearance and death of the de Araujo child in the Chambéry region of south-eastern France. He has been charged with kidnapping and murder of the girl.

Prosecutors also charged Lelandais with the killing of Arthur Noyer, a 24-year-old soldier, who vanished after hitchhiking from a disco in Chambéry on 12 April 2017. Investigators probing the de Araujo case found that Lelandais' cell phone had been in the same area at the same time as Arthur Noyer. Chambéry prosecutor Thierry Dran told a news conference that Lelandais' black Audi A3 car was identified in the area on surveillance cameras, and an analysis of his phone found he had looked up "decomposition of a human body" on the internet.

"We are going to look at all the disturbing disappearances which have taken place in this region," Dran told reporters. When asked about the Annecy shootings, Dran told Le Parisien: "Given this new development, we will be verifying (any connections), and that will naturally be done, to rule out or include (the suspect in the investigation). It would be wrong not to."

January 2022 arrest
On 12 January 2022 a man was arrested in connection with the murders. Along with the arrest, house searches were also conducted and detectives were re-examining the alibis of the suspect. However, he was released after prosecutors said the man had been ruled out as the killer.

Reactions
British Prime Minister David Cameron said: "Obviously the faster we can get to the bottom of what happened, the better." He also said, "I have spoken to the British ambassador in France and consular staff are working very hard so that we do everything we can ... and to find out what happened in this very tragic case."

French President François Hollande said "I expressed my emotion earlier today to the British people in relation to the terrible deaths. Both the French and the British family have been impacted by this terrible event and we will do our utmost to find the perpetrators, to find the reasons behind that event. Our police are co-operating and everything that is found will be shared."

In June 2022 Channel 4 broadcast a three part series Murder in the Alps examining the events and police investigation.

Bibliography
 Tom Parry (2015): The Perfect Crime. Mirror Books.

See also

Crime in France
List of unsolved deaths

References

External links
 Murder in the Alps (2022) Channel 4

Family murders
Mass murder in 2012
2012 crimes in France
Haute-Savoie
Massacres in France
Spree shootings in France
Unsolved murders in France
Deaths by firearm in France
British people murdered abroad
France–United Kingdom relations
Unsolved mass murders
September 2012 crimes
People murdered in France
2012 murders in France
Massacres in 2012
2012 mass shootings in Europe